The W Plan is a 1930 British spy film produced and directed by Victor Saville and starring Brian Aherne, Madeleine Carroll, Gibb McLaughlin, and Gordon Harker. The screenplay was written by Saville with Miles Malleson and Frank Launder, based on the novel of the same name by Graham Seton. When the film was released in the United States, Aherne was appearing in The Barretts of Wimpole Street on Broadway, and receiving praise for his performance as Robert Browning.  The film was a critical success, but did not do well at the box office.

Plot
Colonel Duncan Grant (Brian Aherne) is a British officer during World War I.  When the British high command get wind of a German plan, titled The W Plan, from the lips of a dying German officer, Major Ulrich Muller (George Merritt), they send Grant behind enemy lines to learn the details.  After successfully being dropped by airplane near the German town of Essen, where he makes his way to home of the dead German who was responsible for the plan.  Grant is chosen because he speaks fluent German, having spent a significant amount of time in Germany prior to outbreak of hostilities.  While in Essen, he runs into an old girlfriend, Rose Hartmann (Madeleine Carroll).  When he and Rose go to a nearby café, he is approached by German officers and asked for his papers.  While he has the documents taken from Muller, the Germans become suspicious, and Grant has to make a quick getaway.  Unfortunately, the plane he is supposed to meet with to make his escape is shot down, after which Grant is arrested for desertion.

When he is about to be shot, he is instead sent to the very project he had been sent to Germany to learn about, The W Plan.  It consists of a very elaborate series of underground works which are being dug beneath the British controlled territory, in order to collapse their lines. Grant succeeds in destroying a vital portion of the German underpinnings, and makes his escape back to British territory.  The film ends with the allusion that he will meet up with Rose in Switzerland in the coming days.

Cast
 Brian Aherne as Colonel Duncan Grant
 George Merritt as Major Ulrich Muller
 C. M. Hallard as Commander in Chief
 Frederick Lloyd as Colonel Jervois
 B. Gregory as Flight Commander Mayne
 Mary Jerrold as Frau Muller
 Madeleine Carroll as Rosa Hartmann
 Clifford Heatherley as Café proprietor
 Austin Trevor as Captain of military police
 Norah Howard as Lady of the town
 Cameron Carr as Private Otto Goddern
 Milton Rosmer as President of the court martial
 Alfred Drayton as Prosecuting counsel
 Charles Paton as Defending counsel
 Wilhelm Koenig as Prison commandant
 Gordon Harker as Private Waller
 Gibb McLaughlin as Private 'Ginger' McTavish

(Cast list as per BFI database)

Reception
While The W Plan did not do well at the US box office, it did receive critical acclaim.  Mordaunt Hall of The New York Times gave it a very positive review, applauding the acting of Aherne and Madeleine Carroll, and calling the picture, "... an exciting and splendidly staged English espionage melodrama," and the "... most satisfactory production sent over here from the Elstree Studios."

References

External links

The W Plan at BFI Database

1930 films
1930s thriller films
British spy films
Films shot at British International Pictures Studios
Films directed by Victor Saville
Films based on British novels
Western Front (World War I) films
World War I spy films
Films produced by Victor Saville
Films with screenplays by Victor Saville
Novels set during World War I
British thriller films
1930s English-language films
1930s British films